Events from the year 2006 in North Korea.

Incumbents
Premier: Pak Pong-ju 
Supreme Leader: Kim Jong-il

Events
 2006 North Korean nuclear test
 2006 North Korean missile test

References

Further reading
 

 
North Korea
Years of the 21st century in North Korea
2000s in North Korea
North Korea